"Let Me Talk" is a song by American band Earth, Wind & Fire, released in August 1980 by ARC/Columbia Records as the first single from their tenth album, Faces (1980). It reached No. 8 on the US Billboard  Hot R&B Singles chart and No. 29 on the UK Pop Singles chart.

Overview
Let Me Talk was produced by EWF leader Maurice White. As well the song was composed by White, Ralph Johnson, Phillip Bailey, Larry Dunn, Al McKay and Verdine White.

The B-side of the single was an instrumental version of Let Me Talk. The song has an allegro tempo of 112 beats per minute. Let Me Talk also came off EWF's 1980 album Faces.

Critical reception
Paul Rambali of NME found that the song is "without a recognisable disco beat. Just goes to show that modern soul music is alive and kicking harder at conformity than its recently revived predecessor. Let Me Talk commits the usual Earth, Wind & Fire crime of spoiling the funk with some Vegas showtime horn arrangements, but these are thankfully at a minimum and entirely outweighed by an irresistible riff". Rambali added "This record gives off such a compulsive, joyous, frenzied noise that it's hard to sit still and type, but I can't resist pointing out that amongst more than a few lyrical platitudes it contains the sharpest admonishment of modern culture you're likely to hear from any source. Earth, Wind & Fire narrow it down to just one line, pointing the finger to people who Try to find excitement in the labels that they wear! And that doesn't just mean the labels in clothes, either." Robert Christgau of the Village Voice said "Let Me Talk," is too political in its fluffy way to break down the racism to today's top 40". Mike Nicholls of Record Mirror declared the song "sets off at a punishing pace which is never relinquished. That means it'll be fine for those wishing to slip a disc in discos but home relaxation? Only if you've got shares in Valium. Positively frantic dahling".  

Nelson George of Musician proclaimed "Let Me Talk is in the tradition of distinctive singles like Shining Star, Serpentine Fire and Getaway. Opening with a swirl of Larry Dunn's synthesizer and Al McKay's chucky rhythm guitar, it shifts effortlessly between two grooves while presenting an aggressive lyric filled with references to inflation, Arab oil and the psuedo-chic (trying to find excitement in the labels that you wear) articulated by Maurice White's husky baritone. Billboard stated "EWF's latest is its most rock-oriented release to date with a clipped lead vocal and a steady, rhythmic beat alternating choruses with the more fulsome melodious sound usually connected with the group". Paul Willistein of The Morning Call called Let Me Talk an "enjoyable, though sometimes preachy tune, calling for universal brotherhood".
David Hepworth of Smash Hits exclaimed "Earth, Wind & Fire come over like a warm breeze of simple pleasure, spraying their champagne jazz all over the place and grabbing your heart feet first. This, I have decided, is because there isn't a manjack in that band who isn't hopelessly in love with the sound his instrument makes. More power to them."

"Let Me Talk" also received an honourable mention from NME in their top singles list of 1980.

Music video
A music video for "Let Me Talk" was also released in September 1980. The video had a duration of four minutes.

Charts

References

1980 singles
Earth, Wind & Fire songs
Songs written by Maurice White
Songs written by Philip Bailey
Songs written by Al McKay
Songs written by Verdine White
Songs written by Larry Dunn
1980 songs
Columbia Records singles